Henry William Kumpf Jr. (October 2, 1905 – March 21, 1990) was an American football coach. He was the head coach football at State University of New York at Cortland in Cortland, New York from 1930 to 1931, where he accumulated a record of 6–6–1. He was later the head football coach at Rensselaer Polytechnic Institute in Troy, New York from 1932 to 1938, where he had a record of 10–41–2.  A native of Buffalo, New York, Kumpf played college football as a halfback at Columbia University from 1926 to 1928.

Head coaching record

College football

References

1905 births
1990 deaths
American football halfbacks
Columbia Lions football players
Cortland Red Dragons football coaches
RPI Engineers athletic directors
RPI Engineers football coaches
College swimming coaches in the United States
College track and field coaches in the United States
Sportspeople from Buffalo, New York
Players of American football from Buffalo, New York